José Nazario Dapena Laguna, (28 July 1912 – 20 September 1991) was a Puerto Rican attorney and Mayor of Ponce, Puerto Rico, in 1956.

Early years
José Dapena Laguna was born in Ponce on 28 July 1912. His parents were Ramon Dapena Pacheco and Maria Laguna y Cedo. He was the father of José Dapena Thompson, mayor of Ponce from 1984 to 1988.

Political life
In 1941 he worked as a political aide in the Ponce City Hall, and was also interim municipal secretary. In 1956, he was appointed mayor of Ponce. Later that year (1956) he resigned as mayor to become a member of the House of Representatives of Puerto Rico, a post for which he had been elected. In 1960 he was elected to the Puerto Rico Senate, a post he occupied until 1968.

Schooling
He earned a degree from the University of Puerto Rico School of Law.

Family life
His wife was Georgina Thompson. His children were José (the mayor), Maria Rosa (who became the executive assistant of the first lady of Puerto Rico, Lila Mayoral de Hernandez Colon), Georgianne, and Victoria Eugenia (Baby).

Last years and legacy
Dapena Laguna lead a relatively quiet life the last few years of his life.  He died in Ponce on 20 September 1991, of a heart condition. The government of Ponce honored him by naming the main Ponce firehouse after him.

See also

 Ponce, Puerto Rico
 List of Puerto Ricans

References

Further reading
 Fay Fowlie de Flores. Ponce, Perla del Sur: Una Bibliográfica Anotada. Second Edition. 1997. Ponce, Puerto Rico: Universidad de Puerto Rico en Ponce. p. 319. Item 1602. 
 "Toma de Posesión." Revista Gráfica del Sur Diciembre 1941. Supplement page between pages 26 and 27. (Colegio Universitario Tecnológico de Ponce, CUTPO).

Mayors of Ponce, Puerto Rico
Members of the Senate of Puerto Rico
1912 births
1991 deaths
20th-century American politicians